Callao is a station on Line B of the Buenos Aires Underground. The station was opened on 17 October 1930 as the eastern terminus of the inaugural section of the line between Federico Lacroze and Callao. On 22 July 1931, the line was extended to Carlos Pellegrini.

It is located in the Balvanera barrio, at the intersection of Avenida Corrientes and Avenida Callao, and named after the latter.

References

External links

Buenos Aires Underground stations
Balvanera
Railway stations opened in 1930
1930 establishments in Argentina